Vasyl Malyk (born 23 November 1968) is a former Soviet and Ukrainian footballer and Ukrainian football coach.

References

External links
 

1968 births
Living people
People from Drohobych
Soviet footballers
Ukrainian footballers
Ukrainian expatriate footballers
Expatriate footballers in Russia
Expatriate footballers in Poland
FC Krystal Chortkiv players
FC Halychyna Drohobych players
JKS 1909 Jarosław players
FC Yenisey Krasnoyarsk players
Ukrainian football managers
FC Halychyna Drohobych managers
FC Skala Stryi (2004) managers
Association football midfielders
FC Kalush managers
FC Nyva Ternopil players
Sportspeople from Lviv Oblast